Jasurbek Jaloliddinov (born 15 May 2002) is an Uzbek professional footballer who plays as a midfielder for Uzbekistan Super League club Lokomotiv Tashkent and the Uzbekistan national team. He was included in The Guardian's "Next Generation 2019".

Club career
Pupil of the FC Bunyodkor football Academy. He made his debut in the main squad of FC Bunyodkor on August 2, 2018, in the match of the Uzbekistan Super League against Kokand 1912, becoming the youngest player in the history of the major league of the championship of Uzbekistan. At the time of his debut, he was 16 years and 80 days old. He played 32 matches for FC Bunyodkor, scored 3 goals and made 3 assists.

On 29 July 2020, Jaloliddinov signed a 5-year contract with Russian Premier League club Lokomotiv Moscow. On 13 October 2020, he was loaned to Tambov. On 25 January 2021, the loan was terminated early after he made just one substitute appearance for Tambov in a Russian Cup game, and he subsequently left Lokomotiv Moscow on 26 January 2021 by mutual consent.

Kairat (loan)
On 7 July 2022, Kairat confirmed that Jaloliddinov's loan had ended and that he'd returned to Lokomotiv Tashkent.

International career 
Jaloliddinov  debuted for the Uzbekistan national football team on 23 February 2020 at friendly match against Belarus.

Career statistics

Club

International

References

2002 births
Living people
Uzbekistani footballers
Uzbekistan youth international footballers
Uzbekistan international footballers
Association football midfielders
FC Bunyodkor players
FC Lokomotiv Moscow players
FC Tambov players
FK Andijon players
Uzbekistan Super League players
Uzbekistani expatriate footballers
Expatriate footballers in Russia
People from Navoiy Region